The John Hiatt discography covers material that he recorded from 1974 to the present day. He has recorded over 24 albums, among them two live albums.

Albums

Singles

As a performer, Hiatt has never made the US Hot 100, or the "bubbling under" charts.  He has charted on other, specialized US charts, and has charted on the hit parade in Canada, Netherlands and New Zealand.

Guest singles

Music videos

Album appearances
"Spy Boy", on the soundtrack to the movie Cruising, 1980
"Too Late" and "Skin Game" on the soundtrack to the movie The Border, 1982 (also featuring a cover of "Across the Borderline" by Freddy Fender)
"Take Time to Know Her", on the compilation sampler Attack of the Killer B's Volume One, 1983
"I'm a Real Man", on the soundtrack to the movie Youngblood, 1985
"Snake Charmer", on the soundtrack to the movie White Nights, 1985
"Horse & Crow" duet with Peter Case, on album Peter Case, 1986
"Thank Someone", duet with Amy Grant, on the children's album Free to be... a Family, by Marlo Thomas and Friends, 1988
Guitar on "Love Gets Strange", on the Nick Lowe LP Pinker and Prouder Than Previous, Columbia Records/Demon Music Group, 1988
"One Step Over the Line", duet with Rosanne Cash, on Will the Circle Be Unbroken: Volume Two, by the Nitty Gritty Dirt Band, 1989
"My Girl" and "At the End of a Long Lonely Day", both duets with Loudon Wainwright III, on the compilation album From Hell to Obscurity, 1989
Backing vocalist and whistle solo on "Too Sensitive for This World", on the Ben Vaughn LP Dressed In Black, Enigma Records, 1990
"Up Against The Sky", on the soundtrack to the movie Shout, 1991
"Across The Borderline", guest vocals on the album Partners, by Flaco Jiménez, 1992
"A Mess Of Blues", on the tribute album Till the Night is Gone: A Tribute to Doc Pomus, 1995
"Johnny 99", on the tribute album One Step Up/Two Steps Back: The Songs of Bruce Springsteen, 1997
"Bound By Love", guest vocals on the album Jubilation, by The Band, 1998
"Thirty Years Of Tears", guest vocals on the album Love That Strong, by ElizaBeth Hill, 1999
"The Same Thing", on the tribute album A Tribute to Muddy Waters King of the Blues, 1999
"I’m Satisfied", on the tribute album Avalon Blues: A Tribute to the Music of Mississippi John Hurt, 2001
The Country Bears Official Soundtrack, Disney, 2002
"Everybody Went Low", from the compilation album, WYEP Live and Direct: Volume 4 - On Air Performances, 2002
"Down the Old Plank Road", guest vocals on the album Down the Old Plank Road: The Nashville Sessions, by The Chieftains, 2002
"Jordan is a Hard Road to Travel", guest vocals on the album Further Down the Old Plank Road, by The Chieftains, 2003
"The Ballad of Curtis Loew", performed with moe. on the tribute album Under the Influence: A Jam Band Tribute to Lynyrd Skynyrd, 2004
"I’m Not That Kat (Anymore)", guest vocals on the album Heard it on the X, by Los Super Seven, 2005
"Ain’t no More Cane (On the Brazos)", on the tribute album Endless Highway: The Music of The Band, 2007
"Welfare Music", on the album The Imus Ranch Record, 2008
"Just to Satisfy You", on the tribute album The Music Inside: A Collaboration Dedicated to Waylon Jennings Volume 1, 2011
"Tennessee Plates", guest vocals on the album Dust Bowl by Joe Bonamassa, J&R Adventures, 2011
"Ride On Out a Ways", on the album Use Me by David Bromberg, Appleseed Recordings, 2011

Other releases
 Y'all Caught? The Ones That Got Away 1979–1985 (compilation), Geffen Records, 1989
 Little Village (with Ry Cooder, Nick Lowe & Jim Keltner), Reprise Records, 1992
 Slug Line/Two Bit Monsters (Combo of 2 CDs), Beat Goes On Records, 1993
 Live at the Hiatt (promo CD recorded at the London Forum), A&M Records, 1994
 Greatest Hits: The A&M Years '87 - '94, A&M Records, 1998
 The Best of John Hiatt Capitol Records, 1998
 Anthology (2 CD compilation of Hiatt's material from 1974 to 2000 includes "Spy Boy" from the "Cruisin'" soundtrack) Hip-O, 2001
The Best of John Hiatt: The Millennium Collection, A&M Records, 2003
 "Hangin' Around the Observatory/Overcoats" BGO Records 2006
 "Complete" Universal 9/2012
 "Here to Stay - Best of 2000-2012" New West Records, 2013. 

There are also several albums of his songs performed by other artists, specifically:

 Love Gets Strange: The Songs of John Hiatt, various artists, 1993
 Dear John, Ilse DeLange, 1999
 Rollin' into Memphis: Songs of John Hiatt, various artists, 2000
 It'll Come to You: The Songs of John Hiatt, various artists, 2003

References

Rock music discographies
Folk music discographies
Blues discographies
Discographies of American artists